The Hayman Fire was a forest fire started on June 8, 2002,  northwest of Colorado Springs, Colorado and  southwest of Denver, Colorado and was, for 18 years, the largest wildfire in the state's recorded history at over 138,114 acres. During the 2020 wildfire season, the Pine Gulch Fire became the largest wildfire in state history. However, just 7 weeks later, the Cameron Peak Fire became the largest wildfire in Colorado history.

Hundreds of firefighters fought the fast-moving fire, which caused nearly $40 million in firefighting costs, burned 133 homes, 138,114 acres, and forced the evacuation of 5,340 people.

The Hayman Fire burned from June 8, 2002, until it was classified as contained on July 18, 2002.   The cause of the wildfire was found to be arson.

When then-Governor Bill Owens responded to a reporter's question following an aerial tour of the fires ("What does it look like up there?"), Owens said "It looks as if all of Colorado is burning today." Many western slope residents blamed Owens for driving away tourists with the press' truncated version of the quote ("All of Colorado is burning.") The Hayman Fire was named for a mining ghost town near Tappan Gulch.

Impact of the fire 
The fire resulted directly in the death of one civilian, and five firefighters were killed en route to the fire. Costs included $39.1 million in suppression costs and total private property losses valued at $40.4 million, and indirectly led to the death of five firefighters. Overall, 600 structures were burned in the fire including 133 homes, 1 commercial building and 466 outbuildings. While the fire burned, record amounts of particulate matter were measured in the air.

As a result of the fire, flooding in the burn area increased. Consequently, many roads and bridges in the area were washed out. This included State Highway 67, the main highway that runs through the area. Other indirect destruction included sediment runoff into a reservoir that is used as a water source for Denver. The removal of this sediment cost $25 million.

Most of the burn area is inside of the Pike National Forest. The fire caused the closure of a large part of the national forest land as well as nearby Eleven Mile State Park and Spinney State Park. Tourism saw a sharp decline in the area and it is estimated that local businesses lost 50% of their seasonal revenues as a result of the fire-induced closures.

Fatalities 

Ann Dow, 50, suffered a fatal asthma attack on the evening of June 10, 2002, when heavy smoke from the fire drifted over the Dows' home south of Florissant. She quickly lapsed into unconsciousness and paramedics could not revive her. Her death certificate lists the cause as "acute asthma attack due to or as a consequence of smoke inhalation."

Five firefighters died from injuries sustained from a June 21, 2002, traffic accident en route to the Hayman fire from Oregon: Zach Zigich, Retha Shirley, Jacob Martindale, Danial Rama, and Bart Bailey. They are listed in the memorial to fallen firefighters on the Wildland Firefighter Foundation's website.

Criminal prosecutions 
A forestry technician with the U.S. Forest Service, Terry Barton, set the fire in a campfire ring during a total burn ban triggered by a National Weather Service red flag warning. Barton's claim that she was attempting to burn a letter from her estranged husband was disputed by one of her teenage daughters who testified that a psychology teacher had told Ms. Barton to write her feelings in a letter and burn it. Many locals believe she set the fire on purpose so she could stay home and fight a local Colorado fire instead of being called to fight fires in other states, such as Arizona or California. This would enable her to be with her kids that summer. According to radio talk show host Glenn Sacks, investigators also speculated that Barton started the fire so she could be a hero for putting it out and saving the forest. A federal grand jury indicted Barton on four felony counts of arson.

Barton pleaded guilty to two charges: setting fire to federal forest land and lying to investigators and was given a six-year sentence in federal prison. U.S. District Judge Richard Matsch refused, however, to impose the $14 million restitution asked for by prosecutors, saying he would not sentence her to a "life of poverty." Additionally, the State of Colorado sentenced Barton to 12 years in prison to run concurrently with the 6-year federal sentence. The state sentence was overturned on appeal, however, on grounds that the presiding judge had "the appearance of prejudice" because smoke from the fire had motivated him to voluntarily leave his home for one night. In March 2008, Barton was re-sentenced by a different judge to 15 years of probation and 1,000 hours community service.

Several insurance companies filed a $7 million suit against the government in the fall of 2008, claiming that Barton was negligent in her duties.  In November, Judge Wiley Daniel ruled that the government was not responsible for Barton's actions because she was acting as an angry spouse and not as a government worker.

In August 2018, Barton's sentence was extended another 15 years in the form of unsupervised probation (the unsupervised probation was ordered to save legal fees that would then be redirected towards restitution). Judge William Brian ordered that Barton continue to make payments toward the $14.5 million in restitution she owed as of the 2018 re-sentencing. The judge also ordered that Barton get a full-time job.

Images of fire damage

See also
 Rodeo-Chediski Fire of 2002, a concurrent large wildfire in Arizona
 Healthy Forests Initiative, a federal law passed after the severe wildfires of 2002

References

External links
The Hayman Fire Report
Wildland Firefighter Foundation list of fallen firefighters
maps of the Hayman Fire, Park County Bulletin
The National Forest Foundation's Conservation and Restoration Plan for the Hayman Burn Area

Natural disasters in Colorado
Mass murder in 2002
Wildfires in Colorado
2002 in Colorado
2002 wildfires in the United States
Arson in Colorado